Valea Roșie may refer to the following places in Romania:

 Valea Roșie, a village in Șopotu Nou Commune, Caraș-Severin County 
 Valea Roșie, a village in Mitreni Commune, Călărași County
 Valea Roșie, a tributary of the Azuga in Prahova County
 Valea Roșie (Crișul Negru), a tributary of the Crișul Negru in Bihor County
 Valea Roșie, a tributary of the Firiza in Maramureș County
 Valea Roșie, a tributary of the Bănița in Hunedoara County
 Valea Roșie, a tributary of the Geoagiu in Hunedoara County
 Valea Roșie (Mureș), a tributary of the Petriș in Arad County
 Valea Roșie (Olt), a tributary of the Olt in Covasna County